Francesco Paolo Manassero Zegarra (born 12 April 1964), known as Francesco Manassero, is a Peruvian former professional footballer who played as a midfielder.

Club career
Manassero was born in Lima, Peru. He played for clubs in Peru, Chile, Colombia and Turkey.

International career
Manassero played for Peru at the 1989 Copa América in Brazil and earned a total of 13 caps, scoring one goal.

Honours
Sporting Cristal
 Peruvian Primera División: 1988

Universitario
 Peruvian Primera División: 1992

Notes

References

External links
 
 

1964 births
Living people
Footballers from Lima
Association football midfielders
Peruvian footballers
Peru international footballers
1989 Copa América players
Peruvian Primera División players
Chilean Primera División players
Categoría Primera A players
Süper Lig players
Sporting Cristal footballers
Deportes La Serena footballers
Club Universitario de Deportes footballers
Beşiktaş J.K. footballers
Deportivo Pereira footballers
Deportivo Pesquero footballers
Juan Aurich footballers
FBC Melgar footballers
Peruvian expatriate footballers
Peruvian expatriate sportspeople in Chile
Expatriate footballers in Chile
Peruvian expatriate sportspeople in Colombia
Expatriate footballers in Colombia
Peruvian expatriate sportspeople in Turkey
Expatriate footballers in Turkey